Basketball at the 2015 Island Games was held at the Fort Regent Sports Centre, Saint Helier, Jersey from 28 June to 3 July 2015.

Medal Table

Results

References 

Basketball
Island Games